Return of the Seven, later marketed as Return of the Magnificent Seven, is a 1966 American-Spanish Western film, and the first sequel to The Magnificent Seven (1960). Yul Brynner, who reprises his role as Chris Adams, is the sole returning cast member from the original film, while Robert Fuller, Julián Mateos and Elisa Montés replace Steve McQueen, Horst Buchholz and Rosenda Monteros as Vinn Tanner, Chico and Petra respectively.

The film was written by Larry Cohen and directed by Burt Kennedy, and features Warren Oates, Claude Akins, Jordan Christopher and Virgilio Teixeira. Emilio Fernández is the villain. Fernando Rey portrays a priest. Rey was in the next film, Guns of the Magnificent Seven, as a different character.

Plot
Fifty gunmen force all of the men in a small Mexican village to ride off with them into the desert.  Among the captured farmers is Chico, who years before was one of seven hired gunslingers responsible for ridding the village of a tyrannical bandit, Calvera.  Chico's wife, Petra, seeks out the only other members of the band to survive:  Chris and Vin.  She begs them to save the village once more.  To replace the deceased members of the group, Chris buys the release of Frank (a taciturn gunman) and Luis (a famous bandit), held in the local jail and recruits Colbee, a ladies' man and deadly gunman, and Manuel, a young cockfighter.

The six men discover that the missing villagers are being used as slave labor to rebuild a desert village and church as a memorial to the dead sons of wealthy rancher Lorca.  In a surprise attack, the six gunmen force Lorca's men to leave, and prepare for a counterattack with Chico.  The cowed farmers offer no assistance, but the seven defenders successfully repulse Lorca's initial attack.  Lorca, the rancher, then gathers all of the men on his land to rout the seven men.

The situation seems bleak until Manuel discovers a supply of dynamite which the seven use in a counteroffensive.  They are eventually overrun, but Chris emerges victorious from a shootout with Lorca. The rancher's gang flee, leaving Frank, Luis, and Manuel dead in the fighting. Chico plans to resettle the village on Lorca's fertile land, and Colbee remains to help teach the villagers how to defend themselves against future attacks; he also plans to pursue the available women. Chris and Vin once more ride off together.

Cast

The Seven
 Yul Brynner as Chris Adams
 Robert Fuller as Vin Tanner
 Julián Mateos as Chico
 Warren Oates as Colbee
 Claude Akins as Frank
 Virgilio Teixeira as Luis Emilio Delgado
 Jordan Christopher as Manuel De Norte

Others
 Elisa Montés as Petra, Chico's wife
 Fernando Rey as Priest
 Emilio Fernández as Francisco Lorca
 Rodolfo Acosta as Lopez (credited as Rudy Acosta)
 Gracita Sacromonte as Flamenco Dancer
 Carlos Casaravilla as First Peon
 Ricardo Palacios as Jailer
 Felisa Jiminez as Female Prisoner
 Pedro Bermudez as Boy
 Francisco Antón as Matador
 Moises Menendez as Second Peon
 Hector Quiroga as Third Peon
 Jose Talavera as Fourth Peon

Production
The film was shot in Spain.

Reception
Return of the Seven was critically panned. Art Murphy in industry paper Variety called it "unsatisfactory... plodding, cliche-ridden". On Rotten Tomatoes, the film holds a critical approval of 13%, based on 8 reviews, with an average rating of 3.6/10. Composer Elmer Bernstein received an Academy Award nomination for his score, a re-recorded version of his score for The Magnificent Seven (1960).

The film earned an estimated $1.6 million in theatrical rentals during its initial release in the United States and Canada but did better overseas, earning at least $3.5 million, for a worldwide total of $5.1 million.

The film was re-released in the United States and Canada in 1969 and earned additional rentals of $1.3 million, taking its worldwide total to at least $6.4 million.

See also

List of American films of 1966

References

External links

 
 
 
 
 The Return of The Return of The Magnificent Seven, Bob Yareham, VLC News, 12 June 2013. An article about the locations in Spain.

1966 films
1966 Western (genre) films
American sequel films
American Western (genre) films
Films scored by Elmer Bernstein
Films directed by Burt Kennedy
United Artists films
Films shot in Madrid
Seven Samurai
Magnificent Seven films
Cockfighting in film
Films with screenplays by Larry Cohen
1960s English-language films
1960s American films
1960s Japanese films